Almost Christmas is a 2016 American Christmas comedy-drama film written and directed by David E. Talbert and starring Kimberly Elise, Mo'Nique, Nicole Ari Parker, Gabrielle Union, Keri Hilson, Jessie Usher, Danny Glover, Omar Epps, John Michael Higgins, D. C. Young Fly, and Romany Malco. The film follows a dysfunctional family that comes together for the holidays for the first time since their mother's death.

Principal photography began in late 2015 and early 2016 in Covington, Georgia. The film premiered in Los Angeles on November 3, 2016 and was theatrically released in the United States on November 11, 2016 by Universal Pictures. It received mixed reviews and grossed $42 million.

Plot 
Walter Meyers (Danny Glover) is a retired automotive engineer who lost his wife Grace (Rachel Kylian) 10 months earlier.

Now that the holiday season is here, he invites his four grown children and the rest of the family to his house for a traditional celebration.

Walter knows that if his daughters Cheryl (Kimberly Elise) and Rachel (Gabrielle Union) and sons Christian (Romany Malco) and Evan (Jessie Usher) can spend five days together under the same roof, it will truly be a Christmas miracle. As his children arrive, Walter realizes a perfect Christmas without his wife, Grace is easier said than done.

Cheryl, a dentist and the eldest child, arrives for the holidays with her goofy husband Lonnie (J. B. Smoove), a previously famous basketball player who develops a mutual interest in a young grocery store worker named Jasmine (Keri Hilson) shortly after arriving in town.

His eldest son and second born, Christian, struggles with balancing his campaign to become a congressman and his desire to spend time with his wife and 2 kids. Christian invites his campaign manager along so they can get more work done. His manager helps set him up with potential financial backers.

Meanwhile, Rachel, his youngest daughter and third born, struggles to financially support herself and her daughter due to her recent divorce and studying to become a lawyer.

The youngest, Evan is a successful football player recovering from a shoulder injury, but when his coach tells him his arm is completely healed, Evan struggles to give up the pain medication.

Throughout their 5 days together, the Meyers family experiences ups and downs. Rachel and Cheryl trade barbs at each other, Lonnie has an affair with Jasmine, and Christian is pressured to help demolish a part of town that includes a homeless shelter his mother supported. Out of spite, Rachel invites Jasmine to Christmas dinner to embarrass Lonnie and Cheryl but when the sisters accidentally find their mother's tin of recipes, they stop fighting and Rachel tries to disinvite Jasmine via voicemail. On Christmas Day, Evan discovers Walter plans on selling the house and confronts him. The kids are shocked but Walter stands by his decision. Evan storms off and gets into a car accident. Jasmine arrives to dinner, to Rachel and Lonnie's surprise, and inadvertently reveals their fling to the whole table. Cheryl chases Lonnie off with a shotgun.

Later on, in the hospital, Walter helps Evan confront his grief of losing Grace. Cheryl and Rachel make amends and Cheryl gives her sister a check to help her finish law school. Christian tells his potential backers that he won't demolish the shelter. The film ends with Walter finally perfecting Grace's sweet potato pie and him deciding to keep the house.

Cast 

 Danny Glover as Walter Meyers
 Keon Rahzeem Mitchell as Young Walter Meyers
 A. Sebrena Farmer as Grace Meyers
 Rachel Kylian as Young Grace Meyers
 Kimberly Elise as Dr. Cheryl Meyers, DDS, the eldest daughter
 Romany Malco as Christian Meyers
 Gabrielle Union as Rachel Meyers
 Jessie T. Usher as Evan Meyers
 Mo'Nique as Aunt May Deveraux Johnson-Davis
 J.B. Smoove as Lonnie Maclay
 Nicole Ari Parker as Sonya Meyers
 Omar Epps as Malachi
 Nadej K. Bailey as Niya
 John Michael Higgins as Andy Brooks
 DC Young Fly as Eric
 Keri Hilson as Jasmine
 Monica Brown as Monica the Waitress
 Gregory Alan Williams as Pastor Browning
 Gladys Knight as Dorothy, Shelter Director
 Tara Jones as Lucy
 Jeff Rose as Brian
 Ric Reitz as Coach Packer
Marley Taylor as Dee Meyers
 David E. Talbert as Malachi's Mom (voice)
 Elias Talbert as Young Evan Meyers (voice)
 Donnie Simpson as Radio DJ (voice)
 Lyn Talbert as Young Grace Meyers (voice)

Production 
On April 27, 2015, it was announced that Universal Pictures had bought the comedy script A Meyers Thanksgiving from David E. Talbert, who directed the film, with Will Packer producing through Will Packer Productions. The film was first retitled A Meyers Christmas, with its setting moved to the Christmas holidays. In April 2016, Universal Pictures announced another title change for the film, now called Almost Christmas.

Casting for the film was done in late 2015, in Atlanta, Georgia.  Principal photography took place in Gerogia from early November until December 2015.

Release 
Universal scheduled the film for a November 11, 2016 release. A trailer for the film was released April 14, 2016.

Box office
Almost Christmas was released alongside Arrival and Shut In, and was expected to gross around $15 million from 2,376 theaters in its opening weekend. The film made $507,000 from Thursday night previews at 1,885 theaters and $5.9 million on its first day. It went on to gross $15.6 million for the weekend, finishing fourth at the box office. In its second weekend, the film grossed $7.3 million (a drop of 56%), finishing fifth.

Critical response
The site's critical consensus reads, "While far from the worst holiday dramedy audiences could hope for, Almost Christmas isn't distinctive enough to prompt a visit to the theater – or annual yuletide viewings." On Metacritic, which assigns a normalized rating, the film has a weighted average score of 55 out of 100, based on 27 critics, indicating "mixed or average reviews". Audiences polled by CinemaScore gave the film an average grade of "A−" on an A+ to F scale.

Accolades
For her performance, Mo' Nique was nominated for the Image Award for Best Supporting Actress at the 2017 Image Awards.

See also
 List of Christmas films

References

External links 
 
 
 

2016 films
2016 comedy-drama films
2010s Christmas comedy-drama films
African-American comedy-drama films
American Christmas comedy-drama films
2010s English-language films
Films about Christianity
Films about dysfunctional families
Films directed by David E. Talbert
Films produced by Will Packer
Films set in Atlanta
Films shot in Atlanta
Perfect World Pictures films
Will Packer Productions films
Films scored by John Paesano
2010s American films
African-American films